Kester may refer to:

Kester (name), a surname and given name
Kester (artist), alias of Mozambican artist Cristóvão Canhavato
Kester, Belgium, a village in the Belgian municipality of Gooik
Kester, West Virginia, unincorporated community in Roane County